The Svenska Serien was the top level ice hockey league in Sweden from 1935–1944. It existed alongside the Swedish Ice Hockey Championship, where the national champion was crowned. It was replaced by the Division I for the 1944–45 season.

Champions

External links
List of champions on hockeyarchives.info

  
Defunct ice hockey leagues in Sweden